Pårup halt is a railway halt serving the small settlement of Pårup near Gilleleje in North Zealand, Denmark.

Pårup halt is located on the Gribskov Line from Hillerød to Gilleleje. The train services are currently operated by the railway company Lokaltog which runs frequent local train services between Hillerød station and Gilleleje station.

The station was opened in 1896 with the opening of the Græsted-Gilleleje section of the Gribskov Line. The original station building was designed by architect Heinrich Wenck. The station building has since been torn down.

References

External links

 Lokaltog
 Gribskovbanen on jernbanen.dk

Railway stations in the Capital Region of Denmark
Buildings and structures in Gribskov Municipality
Railway stations opened in 1896
Railway stations in Denmark opened in the 19th century